Hook and Ladder is a 1932 Our Gang short comedy film directed by Robert F. McGowan. It was the 116th (28th talking episode) Our Gang short that was released.

Synopsis
Answering the Fire Chief's request for volunteers, the Our Gang kids form their own firefighting squadron, replete with ersatz uniforms, a fire pole, a dog-and-cat-powered alarm, and a jerry-built fire engine that must be seen to be believed. After a few false alarms and delays, the kids are afforded the opportunity to put out a real fire, which they do with the expertise of veteran smoke-eaters.

Cast

The Gang
Sherwood Bailey as Spud
Matthew Beard as Stymie
Dorothy DeBorba as Dorothy
Kendall McComas as Breezy 
George McFarland as Spanky
Dickie Moore as Dickie
Buddy McDonald as Speck
Harold Wertz as Bouncy
 Pete the Pup as himself
 Laughing Gravy as Dog in Dickie's car

Additional cast
 Gene Morgan as Fireman
 Don Sandstrom as Fire hazard bit

Notes and critique
Hook and Ladder is a remake of the 1926 Our Gang comedy The Fourth Alarm; hand made carts the "Our Gang" kids ride on in this film are exactly the same ones used in The Fourth Alarm. Gags from the 1922 "Our Gang" comedy Fire Fighters are also re-used. An amusing running gag involving Spanky McFarland's worm medicine punctuates this lively series entry.

Hook and Ladder employed the usual jazz based scoring about two thirds of the time. One third of the time the film reverted to an orchestral music scoring with several tunes from the 1930 Our Gang film When The Wind Blows. Most of the orchestral scoring was employed during the scenes where the gang was fighting a real fire.

This marked Dickie Moore's first appearance. He would be a lead character but would only remain for a season. This was also Sherwood Bailey's and Buddy McDonald's last appearances on the series.

It is also the final time an Our Gang title card says:  'Our Gang' Comedies: Hal Roach presents His Rascals in...

See also
 Our Gang filmography

References

External links
 
 

1932 films
American black-and-white films
Films about firefighting
Films directed by Robert F. McGowan
Hal Roach Studios short films
1932 comedy films
Our Gang films
Films with screenplays by H. M. Walker
1930s American films